Kakahi) is a small King Country settlement about  up the Whanganui River from Taumarunui, New Zealand. Founded as a sawmill town, it takes its name from the Māori word for the New Zealand freshwater mussel.

Geography 

Kakahi can be reached from State Highway 4, and the North Island Main Trunk railway passes through it across a bridge over the Kakahi Stream; a railway station was open from 1904 to 1978. Te Rena Road is notable for extensive colonies of glowworms along the sheer banks where the road cuts deeply through the hillside.

History

Early history

Kakahi has a long history of Māori settlement, and four fortified pā sites. In about the 15th century, Ngāti Hotu people were defeated here by Whanganui Māori in the battle of the five forts.

In February 1862 James Coutts Crawford crossed the Whakapapa River and camped across from Terena.

20th century

Last century Kakahi was a King Country sawmill town, with four timber mills around the township, many tram lines for moving the timber (mainly totara). Kakahi also had three churches, one hotel (burned to the ground), one boarding house and a pool hall. The Kakahi Primary School closure had a serious impact on population numbers, the Kakahi General Store and post office, and the new Kakahi Hall.

In 1906, Ngāti Tūwharetoa and the Tongariro Timber Company struck an agreement for the construction of a  Kakahi to Pukawa railway line, connecting the main trunk line to the shores of Lake Taupō. Subsequently, in 1908 a case was put to the Stout Ngata Commission over the lack of action. By May 1929 this line had still not been built and the government acquired the Tongariro Timber Company. A road was deemed at being more viable. The Tongariro Timber Company railway land was finally disposed by the New Zealand Parliament in the Māori Purposes Act.

In 1922 Te Rena School is closed. 

In 1923 Lake Falconer Ayson, Chief Inspector of Fisheries, visits the Kakahi hatcheries, to liberate half a million Atlantic salmon fry into the Whanganui River, Whakapapa River, Kakahi Stream, Punga Punga Stream and other tributaries. These fry were successfully hatched in the Kakahi hatchery by Mr. Bebbington.

Modern history 

The Kakahi Town Hall was originally commissioned by one of the local timber milling businesses and was used as a silent movies cinema and dance hall.  As such it still retains its piano, fireproof Celluloid film projection room and even has copper tubing in the ceiling for the "white spirit" internal lighting system.

Other commercial buildings that remain in Kakahi that are no longer in their original use are the butcher, baker (complete with retired bread oven), original post-office and a blacksmith's stables.

The Kakahi bakers were known for trucking their hot bread widely in the region, and even supplied many of the Bush Mills in the hills as far away as National Park. The expression "The best thing since sliced bread" belies the fact that many small bakers could not afford the expensive patented (and sometimes unreliable) bread slicers. This was a contributing factor in the closing of bakers here.

Kakahi has an iconic general store, one of the last few remaining general stores in New Zealand. It is run by Manu Lala, who is one of the cornerstones of the community. The store has been run by the Lala family since 1937.

The Kakahi area is also noted for trout fly fishing.

Marae

Kākahi Marae and its Taumaihiorongo meeting house, built in 1913, are a meeting place for the Ngāti Tūwharetoa hapū of Ngāti Manunui. A Catholic church, complete with a bell tower, stands on the edge of the marae. In October 2020, the Government committed $1,338,668 from the Provincial Growth Fund to upgrade it and four other marae.

Te Rena Marae and Hikairo meeting house, located near Kakahi, is a meeting place for the Ngāti Tūwharetoa hapū of Ngāti Hikairo. In October 2020, the Government committed $1,560,379 to upgrade it and 7 other nearby marae.

Sports

The local sports teams are generally dressed in blue and gold. The Domain, a sports field to the north of the village, was the base of the Kakahi field hockey team, and regular motocross and the Kakahi rodeo Club competitions in the 1970s, which raised funds for community activities. Around the Domain are the remains of a racing bicycle track, part of which was washed away during the 1950s flood.

Education

Kakahi School was opened in 1910 to account for an economic and industrial boom in the area. Kakahi School was a co-educational state primary school for Year 1 to 8 students. In 2015, nine students were reported on the school roll, by 2016 there were zero students on the roll. Kakahi School officially closed April 15 2016.

Notable people
Keith Chapple (1944–2005), former Royal Forest and Bird Protection Society of New Zealand president.
Peter McIntyre (1910–1995), official New Zealand war artist in WWII, had a holiday house at Kakahi, and published a 1972 book of paintings entitled Kakahi New Zealand.

References

External links
Kakahi Hall – NASA Satellite Image
Composite Satellite/Radar Image of Kakahi with Mountains: Ruahehu, Tongarero and Ngarahoe in background

Populated places in Manawatū-Whanganui
Settlements on the Whanganui River
Ruapehu District
Ngāti Hotu